Archaeological Museum, Thrissur is an art and archaeological museum situated in Thrissur City of Kerala state, India. The museum is located in the Thrissur Zoo compound.

History
The archaeological museum was started as Sree Mulam Chithrasala (Picture Gallery) in 1938 under the auspices of the Government of Cochin. The gallery was started in the balcony of Thrissur Town Hall, Thrissur City. Later an archaeological gallery was attached to the Picture Gallery in 1948. In 1975, the Department of Archaeology purchased a building at Chembukavu in Thrissur City and the archaeological and Picture Gallery were shifted to the new building in 1975 and named it as Archaeological Museum, Thrissur.

Collections
The museum houses big life-size statues of famous and eminent personalities, models of ancient temples, monuments, manuscripts written on dry palm leaves, megalith collection consisting of earthen pots, Urn burials (Nannangadi) black and red wares, black wares russet coated wares, stone age tools, excavated materials from Indus Valley civilization and Harappa, excavated materials from megalithic sites like beads, iron implements, excavated materials from Cheraman Parambu (Kodungallur) stone sculptures ranging from the 10th century to the 7th century, bronze sculptures ranging from the 12th century to the 18th century etc. It has artifacts from Thrissur district, Wayanad district and Palakkad district.

 Open 10:00–17:00 all days except Mondays and national holidays

References

External links
 Kerala Tourism Guide

Museums in Thrissur
Museums established in 1938
1938 establishments in India
Archaeological museums in India
Art museums and galleries in India